The canton of Montluçon-Nord-Est is a former administrative division in central France. It was disbanded following the French canton reorganisation which came into effect in March 2015. It had 11,228 inhabitants (2012).

The canton comprised the following communes:
Montluçon (partly)
Saint-Victor
Vaux

Demographics

See also
Cantons of the Allier department

References

Former cantons of Allier
2015 disestablishments in France
States and territories disestablished in 2015